Don Mansale (born 10 October 1991) is a Vanuatuan footballer who plays as a striker for Tupuji Imere F.C. in the Port Vila Football League.

References

External links
 Fiji Football Association profile

1991 births
Living people
Vanuatuan footballers
Association football forwards
Vanuatu international footballers
Tafea F.C. players
Beach soccer players
Futsal players
Tupuji Imere F.C. players
2016 OFC Nations Cup players